METAREAs are geographical sea regions for the purpose of coordinating the transmission of meteorological information to mariners on international voyages through international and territorial waters.  These regions are part of the Global Maritime Distress Safety System.  The regions are identical to NAVAREAs which are used to coordinate the transmission of navigational hazards to the same mariners.  Mariners receive the meteorological and navigational information via NAVTEX.  The Worldwide Met-Ocean Information and Warning Service Sub Committee of the WMO Services Commission is responsible for the coordination of the dissemination of this information for METAREAs.

METAREA Descriptions

Countries responsible for the issuance of the final METAREA bulletins are known as the "Issuing Services".  Since METAREAs often straddle the territorial waters of more than one country, more than one nation may contribute to the content of the METAREAs bulletins.  Countries contributing to the METAREAs bulletins are known as "Preparation Services". The current METAREA Coordinator list is updated by WMO.

References

Marine meteorology
Maritime safety
Nautical terminology